Ochinee (died November 29, 1864), also known as Lone Bear and One-Eye, was a Native American Peace Chief of the Cheyenne tribe. He was the father of Amache Prowers, a tradeswoman, advocate and leader among the Southern Cheyenne. Ochinee, who had worked to create peace for the Cheyenne, died during the Sand Creek massacre on November 29, 1864.

Attempts to broker peace
Ochinee, a sub-chief, helped negotiate a treaty between the government, Cheyenne, and Arapaho to  safely camp along Sand Creek during the winter of 1864–1865. Ochinee went to Fort Lyon on September 4, 1864 with his wife to deliver a letter to Major Ned Wynkoop from Black Kettle and other chiefs. Nervous soldiers tried to shoot him when he approached the fort. The letter conveyed that Cheyenne people were fearful of raids and were starving. Black Kettle released white people that the Cheyenne had taken captive and asked to discuss a solution for peace. Ochinee, his wife Minimic, and a man that had accompanied them, were put under guard and taken on a four-day ride with 127 soldiers and taken to an encampment of Arapaho and Cheyenne people on the Smoky Hill River. Wynkoop encouraged tribal chiefs, including Black Kettle and Arapaho Chief Niwot (Left Hand) to travel with him to Denver to meet with Territorial Governor, John Evans and Colonel John Chivington. The delegation left for Denver for the September 28 meeting at Camp Weld.

With other members of the delegation, he met with the Territorial Governor, John Evans. Colonel John Chivington certified that Ochinee was a man of good character and a "friendly Indian." Before the attack, the John Wesley Prowers family, including his daughter Amache Prowers, were held hostage to prevent them warning Cheyenne at the Sand Creek winter camp site of the eminent attack.

Sand Creek massacre

On November 29, 1864, the Cheyenne encampment at the Sand Creek was attacked by 600 soldiers of the Colorado Volunteer Cavalry and Ochinee and 160 other people, most of whom were children and women, were killed. The troops were led by Colonel John Chivington upon the orders of John Evans, the territorial governor of Colorado. 

His wife was able to escape. Amache went later to the Congress with her husband and testified to seek justice for the Cheyenne. Cheyenne men sought retribution after the Sand Creek massacre. Called Cheyenne dog soldiers, they looted and terrorized the area.

Ochinee's wife, Amache, and her two oldest daughters each received reparations by the United States government in the form of 640 acres of land along the Arkansas River, which she used to expand her family's cattle ranch. The rest of Ochinee's family moved to Indian Territory, now Oklahoma.

Personal life
Ochinee's wife was Minimic. He had a daughter, Amache, who married a white man, John Wesley Prowers. Minimic taught Amache how to make tepees from buffalo hides; how to make and decorate clothing from hides, beads, and animal teeth; and how to select wild plants for medicine, dyes, and food.

Legacy
The Achonee Mountain in the Indian Peaks Wilderness was named after him.

Notes

References

Date of birth unknown
1864 deaths
People from Colorado
Cheyenne and Arapaho Tribes people
Native American history of Colorado
Santa Fe Trail